Kendziorski is a Polish surname. Notable people with the surname include:

Casimir Kendziorski (1898–1974), American politician
Christina Kendziorski, American biostatistician

Polish-language surnames
Surnames of Polish origin